Six ships of the Royal Navy have borne the name HMS Racoon, after the raccoon:

 was a 14-gun brig-sloop. In 1782 she was under the command of Edmund Nagle. The French frigates  and Gloire captured her off the Delaware River in September 1782. The British were able to capture Aigle, and with her all of Racoons crew. Racoon herself escaped and was last listed at Rochefort in 1785.
 was a 16-gun brig-sloop launched in 1795 and broken up in 1806.
 was an 18-gun sloop launched in 1808. She was used as a convict ship from 1819 and was sold in 1838.
 was a wood screw sloop launched in 1857 and broken up in 1877.
 was a torpedo cruiser launched in 1887 and sold in 1905.
 was a  launched in 1910 and wrecked in 1918.

See also
  was the former civilian yacht Halonia before being commissioned into the RCN in 1940.  sank her in 1942.

Citations

References

 

Royal Navy ship names